Squadron of Flying Hussars is a 1980 Soviet war film directed by Nikita Khubov  and Stanislav Rostotsky.

Plot 
Denis Davydov, a poet and hero, a man who became a legend during his lifetime, literally conquered his generation. Pushkin, Vyazemsky, Zhukovsky, Baratynsky and many other poets sang in their poems the military and poetic talent, tremendous charm and straightforward nobility, desperate courage and energy of the hussar and partisan, the hero of a glorious and turbulent time for Russia.

Cast 
 Andrei Rostotsky as Denis Davydov
 Marina Shimanskaya as Catherine
 Lidiya Kuznetsova as Katerina, a peasant woman
 Yevgeni Lebedev as Mikhail Kutuzov
 Yuri Rychkov as Popov
 Nikolai Yeremenko Jr. as Prince Bolkhovsky
 Andrei Syomin as Mitya Beketov
 Aleksandr Karin as Mikhail Grigorievich Bedryaga
 Aleksandr Zimin as Budelyok
 Vladimir Mashchenko as Colonel Eichen
 Ivan Krasko as Colonel Ustimovich
 Igor Kashintsev as Khrapovitsky
 Boris Klyuyev as  French officer
 Fyodor Odinokov as a partisan peasant
 Igor Yasulovich as French tailor
 Georgy Martirosyan as French officer (uncredited)
Songs to verses by Denis Davydov were performed by Alexander Khochinsky

References

External links 
 

1980 films
1980s Russian-language films
Soviet war films
Films directed by Stanislav Rostotsky
Gorky Film Studio films
Partisan films
Films about the French invasion of Russia
Napoleonic Wars films
1980s war films